Tahoua  is a department of the Tahoua Region in Niger. Its capital lies at the city of Tahoua. It includes the towns of Bambay and Kalkou. As of 2011, the department had a total population of 500,361 people.

References

Departments of Niger
Tahoua Region